The 1902 Toronto Argonauts season was the club's 17th season of organized league play since its inception in 1873. The team finished in second place in the senior series of the Ontario Rugby Football Union with two wins and two losses, and failed to qualify for the Dominion playoffs.

Regular season
The Hamilton Tigers withdrew from the competition after playing one game, and victory in their remaining scheduled games was defaulted to their opponent.

Standings

Schedule

References

Toronto Argonauts seasons